"So Sad About Us" is a 1966 song by British rock band the Who, first released on the band's second album A Quick One. Originally written for the Merseys, "So Sad About Us" has likely been covered more frequently than any other song on the album; according to AllMusic, it is "one of the Who's most covered songs". Versions by the Breeders and the Jam are among the best known covers.

The Who FAQ author Mike Segretto describes "So Sad About Us" as "an unusually mature, bittersweet farewell for a sixties pop group."  Instead of criticizing the girl he is breaking up with, the singer admits that he will always love her while acknowledging that their relationship can't last.

Beyond the sheer number of covers, it is also one of the Who's most frequently imitated songs. As the aforementioned AMG put it, it is "an archetypal early Who song" and "hundreds of bands have based their entire careers on this one song". With its ringing guitars, unpolished harmonies, crashing drums, and lovelorn lyrics, it is one of the early forebears of the power pop genre.

Personnel
Roger Daltrey – lead vocals
Pete Townshend – guitar, backing vocals
John Entwistle – bass, backing vocals
Keith Moon – drums

Notes

1966 songs
The Who songs
The Breeders songs
Songs written by Pete Townshend
Song recordings produced by Kit Lambert
British garage rock songs